Arachnacris is an Asian genus of large bush crickets in the sub-family Mecopodinae and tribe Mecopodini.  They are found in tropical forest areas of Malesia.

Species 
The Orthoptera Species File lists:
Arachnacris amboinensis Donovan, 1800
Arachnacris corporalis Karny, 1924
Arachnacris regalis Karny, 1924
Arachnacris tenuipes Giebel, 1861 - type species (synonym A. imperator Snellen van Vollenhoven, 1865)

References

External links

Tettigoniidae genera
Mecopodinae
Orthoptera of Asia